Tiquilia palmeri is a species of flowering plant in the borage family known by the common names Palmer's crinklemat and Palmer's tiquilia.

It is native to the southwestern United States and northern Mexico, where it grows in sandy desert areas.

Description
Tiquilia palmeri is a woody perennial herb producing a white-barked, shaggy-haired stem. The clustered leaves have small, hairy, wrinkled blades rarely more than a centimeter long which are borne on longer petioles.

The inflorescence is a cluster of flowers borne in the leaf axils. Each flower has a bell-shaped purple, lavender, or bluish corolla up to a centimeter long with a short, tubular throat.

This is the main host plant for the rare Coachella Valley grasshopper (Spaniacris deserticola).

References

External links
Jepson Manual Treatment of Tiquilia palmeri
UC Photos gallery — Tiquilia palmeri

palmeri
Flora of the California desert regions
Flora of Arizona
Flora of Baja California
Flora of the Coachella Valley
Flora of Nevada
Flora of Riverside County, California
Flora of Sonora
Flora of the Sonoran Deserts
Natural history of the Colorado Desert
Natural history of the Mojave Desert
North American desert flora
Least concern plants